Walentynowicz is a Polish surname. Notable people with the surname include:

 Anna Walentynowicz (1929–2010), Polish anti-communist activist
 Leonard F. Walentynowicz (1932–2005), American diplomat
 Marian Walentynowicz (1896–1967), Polish graphic artist

Polish-language surnames